Thomas M. Baxa is an artist whose work has appeared in role-playing games.

Biography
Tom Baxa grew up in the suburbs of Chicago. He enrolled at Northern Illinois University, where he studied under comic and fantasy artist Mark Nelson.

Works
Tom Baxa has continued to produce interior illustrations for many Dungeons & Dragons books and Dragon magazine since 1989, as well as cover art for Realmspace (1991), Greyspace (1992), Swamplight (1993), and Forest Maker. He has also produced artwork for many other games including Teenage Mutant Ninja Turtles & Other Strangeness (Palladium Books), Torg (West End Games), GURPS (Steve Jackson Games), Shadowrun and Earthdawn (FASA Corporation), and illustrated cards for the Magic: The Gathering collectible card game.

Baxa was the Artist Guest of Honor for Gen Con Indy 2010.

References

External links
 
 Baxa Art - official home page

Living people
Northern Illinois University alumni
Role-playing game artists
Year of birth missing (living people)